USNS Guam (T-HST-1), formerly Hawaii Superferry's Huakai, is a United States Navy high-speed transport vessel. The ship was completed in September 2008 and was intended to start Hawaiian service in May 2009, though delivery postponements saw that planned service canceled. In the Hawaiian language, huakai means "journey".

Vessel

USNS Guam was built as Huakai, whose name is based on the Hawaiian language word huakai, which means "journey". The vessel was originally built for Hawaii Superferry, and has a capacity of 866 passengers and up to 282 subcompact cars. It is  longer than its sister ship, due to a bi-fold ramp installed on the stern of the ship.

The vessel featured environmentally friendly technologies including non-toxic bottom paint, zero wastewater discharge and clean diesel engines.

Austal USA, a subsidiary of Austal, an Australian company that is the world's largest builder of fast ferries, built Huakai. Construction on Huakai began in 2007 in Mobile, Alabama. The ship was intended to enter service in 2009, but due to the abrupt shut down of the company, the ship was laid up. Alakai also returned to the Alabama ship yard. On July 2, 2009 Hawaii Superferry decided to abandon Huakai and Alakai.

Service history
In January 2010, the United States Maritime Administration announced that Huakai and Alakai would be used to assist with relief in the 2010 Haiti earthquake.

On September 13, 2010, Huakai and Alakai were auctioned off, for $25 million each, by the U.S. District Court for the Eastern District of Virginia. They were purchased by the U.S. Department of Transportation's Maritime Administration.

On January 27, 2012, The U.S. Department of Transportation’s Maritime Administration transferred two high speed vessels, Huakai and Alakai, to the U.S. Navy under the Defense Authorization Act of 2012. The Navy had planned to use the vessels to transport troops and equipment to training areas from Okinawa and other locations, helping the Navy meet these unique operational requirements without the need to build new vessels.

In May 2012, The Navy has announced that both Alakai and Huakai have been renamed. Alakai was renamed  and Huakai became Guam. Guam was modified to replace the chartered  in Okinawa in March 2013, and Puerto Rico remained laid up until 2016.

References

External links
 Hawaii Superferry’s Bankruptcy = US Navy Opportunity—Defense Industry Daily

 

Ferries of Hawaii
High-speed craft
2008 ships
High speed vessels of the United States Navy
Military catamarans